Loxostege is a genus of moths of the family Crambidae.

Species

Loxostege aemulalis (Dognin, 1905)
Loxostege aeruginalis (Hübner, 1796)
Loxostege albiceralis (Grote, 1878)
Loxostege albifascialis Walsingham & Hampson, 1896
Loxostege allectalis (Grote, 1877)
Loxostege anartalis (Grote, 1878)
Loxostege angustipennis (Zerny, 1914)
Loxostege annaphilalis (Grote, 1881)
Loxostege argyrostacta (Hampson, 1910)
Loxostege aurantiacalis (Warren, 1889)
Loxostege badakschanalis (Amsel, 1970)
Loxostege bicoloralis Warren, 1892
Loxostege brunneitincta Munroe, 1976
Loxostege caradjana (Popescu-Gorj, 1991)
Loxostege cereralis (Zeller, 1872)
Loxostege clathralis (Hübner, 1813)
Loxostege commixtalis (Walker, 1866)
Loxostege comptalis (Freyer, 1848)
Loxostege confusalis (South in Leech & South, 1901)
Loxostege damergouensis Rothschild, 1921
Loxostege darwinialis (Sauber, 1904)
Loxostege decaryalis Marion & Viette, 1956
Loxostege deliblatica Szent-Ivány & Uhrik-Meszáros, 1942
Loxostege diaphana (Caradja & Meyrick, 1934)
Loxostege egregialis Munroe, 1976
Loxostege ephippialis (Zetterstedt, 1839)
Loxostege eversmanni (Staudinger, 1892)
Loxostege expansalis (Eversmann, 1852)
Loxostege farsalis Amsel, 1950
Loxostege fascialis (Hübner, 1796)
Loxostege flavinigralis (Hampson, 1910)
Loxostege floridalis Barnes & McDunnough, 1913
Loxostege formosibia (Strand, 1918)
Loxostege frustalis (Zeller, 1852)
Loxostege galbula (C. Felder, R. Felder & Rogenhofer, 1875)
Loxostege graeseri (Staudinger, 1892)
Loxostege heliosalis (Hampson, 1912)
Loxostege immerens Harvey, 1875
Loxostege impeditalis (Maassen, 1890)
Loxostege inconspicualis (Zerny, 1914)
Loxostege indentalis (Grote, 1883)
Loxostege kearfottalis Walter, 1928
Loxostege kingi Munroe, 1976
Loxostege lepidalis (Hulst, 1886)
Loxostege leucalis (Hampson, 1900)
Loxostege leuconeuralis (Hampson, 1908)
Loxostege malekalis Amsel, 1950
Loxostege manualis (Geyer in Hübner, 1832)
Loxostege minimalis Amsel, 1956
Loxostege mira Amsel, 1951
Loxostege mojavealis Capps, 1967
Loxostege mucosalis (Herrich-Schäffer, 1848)
Loxostege munroealis Leraut, 2005
Loxostege naranjalis (Schaus, 1920)
Loxostege nissalis (Amsel, 1961)
Loxostege oberthuralis Fernald, 1894
Loxostege oblinalis (C. Felder, R. Felder & Rogenhofer, 1875)
Loxostege ochrealis (Wileman, 1911)
Loxostege oculifera (E. Hering, 1901)
Loxostege offumalis (Hulst, 1886)
Loxostege peltalis (Eversmann, 1842)
Loxostege peltaloides (Rebel in Wagner, 1932)
Loxostege perticalis (C. Felder, R. Felder & Rogenhofer, 1875)
Loxostege phaeoneuralis (Hampson, 1900)
Loxostege phaeopteralis (Hampson, 1913)
Loxostege quaestoralis (Barnes & McDunnough, 1914)
Loxostege rhabdalis (Hampson, 1900)
Loxostege scalaralis (Christoph, 1877)
Loxostege scutalis (Hübner, 1813)
Loxostege sedakowialis (Eversmann, 1852)
Loxostege sierralis Munroe, 1976
Loxostege sticticalis (Linnaeus, 1761)
Loxostege straminealis (Hampson, 1900)
Loxostege subcuprea (Dognin, 1906)
Loxostege terpnalis Barnes & McDunnough, 1918
Loxostege tesselalis (Guenee, 1854)
Loxostege thallophilalis (Hulst, 1886) or Loxostege thrallophilalis
Loxostege triselena (Meyrick, 1937)
Loxostege turbidalis (Treitschke, 1829)
Loxostege typhonalis Barnes & McDunnough, 1914
Loxostege unicoloralis (Barnes & McDunnough, 1914)
Loxostege uniformis (Hampson, 1913)
Loxostege venustalis (Stoll in Cramer & Stoll, 1781)
Loxostege violaceotincta (Caradja, 1939)
Loxostege virescalis (Guenée, 1854)
Loxostege wagneri Zerny in Wagner, 1929
Loxostege xuthusalis (Hampson in Elwes, Hampson & Durrant, 1906)
Loxostege ziczac (Sauber, 1899)

Status unclear
Loxostege pallidalis (Haworth, 1811), described as Pyralis pallidalis from Great Britain.

Former species
Loxostege clarissalis (Schaus, 1920)
Loxostege concoloralis (Lederer, 1857)
Loxostege flavivenalis (Hampson, 1913)
Loxostege plumbatalis (Zeller, 1852)

References

External links

 

Pyraustinae
Crambidae genera
Taxa named by Jacob Hübner